Silent Service is a submarine simulator video game designed by Sid Meier and published by MicroProse for various 8-bit home computers in 1985 and for 16-bit systems like the Amiga in 1987. A Nintendo Entertainment System version developed by Rare was published in 1989 by Konami in Europe and by Konami's Ultra Games subsidiary in North America. Silent Service II was released in 1990. Tommo purchased the rights to this game and published it online through its Retroism brand in 2015.

Gameplay

Silent Service is set in the Pacific Ocean during World War II, with the player assuming control of a U.S. Gato-class submarine for various war patrols against Japanese shipping. "Silent Service" was a nickname for the US Navy's submarine force in the Pacific during World War II. The player can choose when to attack from a range of realistic tactics, including the End Around and near invisibility at night (if the sub's profile is kept to a minimum). It allows four projectiles concurrently, a challenge when battling multiple destroyers. Real-time is accelerated when not in combat.

Sid Meier described several key factors that influenced the design of the game: The size of the theater, the variety of tactical situations, and evolving technology, such as the use of surface radar and torpedoes that did or did not leave trails of bubbles on the surface—only simulations set after their real-life introduction had access to these. Tasks such as navigation, damage repair, and firing were compartmentalized into different screens to allow players access to a great deal of information, but also to focus on the immediate task.

Development
The game was designed by Sid Meier, the art which was made by Michael O. Haire. Silent Service was in development for 8 months and its creation was inspired by a fractal technological trick.

Reception
Silent Service was MicroProse's second best-selling Commodore game as of late 1987. The company sold 250,000 copies by March 1987, and roughly 400,000 overall.

Info in 1985 rated Silent Service for the Commodore 64 four stars out of five, stating that its quality and graphics "are all unmistakably MicroProse" and "ensure a satisfying level of play for any wargamer". Antic wrote in 1986 that "Sid Meier and his team of simulation experts at MicroProse have outdone themselves". The magazine approved of how the game offered both beginner modes and "complex, historically accurate, and challenging war patrol scenarios" for experts, and noted the Atari 8-bit version's "superb" graphics and "well done" manual". Antic in 1987 also liked the Atari ST version's graphics, sound, adjustable difficulty levels, and documentation, concluding: "It's a traditional MicroProse product and it's nice to see that they've remained dedicated to detail". Compute! wrote in 1986 that "like F-15 Strike Eagle, Silent Service is both intriguing and addictive... a superior product".

Computer Gaming World in 1986 called Silent Service "easily the best [submarine simulator] for its simplicity of use and execution". It praised the game's realism and only criticized the lack of a save game feature. Gregg Williams reviewed the Atari 8-bit home computer version for Computer Gaming World, complimenting the graphics and sound and saying that they support the illusion of realism. A 1987 overview of World War II simulations in the magazine rated the game five out of five stars, praising its "superb graphics coupled with detailed rules, historical accuracy and layers of complexity". In 1993 a survey of wargames in the magazine gave the game two stars out of five, stating that "it has been rendered obsolete by time and superseded by Silent Service II". In 1996 Computer Gaming World ranked it as the 86th best game of all time, for having "introduced the control-room interface for submarine games on variety of platforms".

Silent Service was awarded the Charles S. Roberts Award for "Best Adventure Game for Home Computer of 1985".

Sequel

References

External links
 
 

1985 video games
Amiga games
Amstrad CPC games
Apple II games
Apple IIGS games
Atari 8-bit family games
Atari ST games
Commodore 64 games
DOS games
Games commercially released with DOSBox
MicroProse games
Nintendo Entertainment System games
Origins Award winners
Sid Meier games
Single-player video games
Submarine simulation video games
TRS-80 Color Computer games
U.S. Gold games
Video games developed in the United States
Video games set in Asia
Video games set in Oceania
World War II video games
ZX Spectrum games
Video games scored by David Wise
Pacific War video games
Tommo games